Barry Dugmore (born 1961) is an Anglican priest who has served as Archdeacon Missioner  in the Diocese of Coventry since October 2019.

Dugmore trained through the Southern Theological Education and Training Scheme and was ordained in 2002. His first post was a curacy in Cowplain. He was the incumbent at Tiverton from 2007 to 2015; and Mission Enabler for the Diocese of Exeter from 2015 until his appointment as an archdeacon.

References

1961 births
Living people
21st-century English Anglican priests
20th-century English Anglican priests
Archdeacons of Warwick